ICGS Vishwast (OPV-30) is one of the three Vishwast-class offshore patrol vessel (OPV) of the Indian Coast Guard.

History 
The vessel was built in India by Goa Shipyard Ltd.(GSL) and was commissioned in March 2010 in the Indian Coast Guard by then defence minister A K Antony. ICGSVishwast is 90 metres in length and weighs 2400 tons. In 2015, the ship was deployed to Malaysia and Myanmar. In 2016, the ship was deployed to a visit to Bangladesh, Myanmar and Thailand - where it exercised with the navies of the respective countries to be prepared in case of a situation when the navies of two countries have to operate together. ICGS Vishwast is capable of fire-fighting, search and patrol, pollution control (in case of oil spillage) and maritime surveillance.

See also 
Vishwast-class offshore patrol vessel

References 

2008 ships
Ships of the Indian Coast Guard
Ships built in India